Charmaleh-ye Olya (also Romanized as Charmaleh-ye ‘Olyā; also known as Charmaleh-ye Bālā) is a village in Bavaleh Rural District, in the Central District of Sonqor County, Kermanshah Province, Iran. At the 2006 census, its population was 386, in 81 families.

References 

Populated places in Sonqor County